Cypretherium coarctatum is an extinct entelodont from the Chadronian strata of the Cypress Hills Formation in Saskatchewan. The only known fossils are partial ribs, broken tusks and a femur are found in 1887.

References 

Fossils of Canada
Entelodonts
Eocene even-toed ungulates
Paleontology in Saskatchewan
Prehistoric even-toed ungulate genera